Mikhail Aleksandrovich Mikhailov (alternate spelling: Mikhaylov) (born 17 May 1971 in Zlatoust, USSR) is a former Russian-Spanish professional basketball player and coach. In 1994, he was an Honored Master of Sports of Russia.

Professional career
Mikhailov was a member of the FIBA European Selection team, in 1995. In the Summer of 1996, Mikhailov turned down a contract offer from the NBA's Sacramento Kings.

National team career
Mikhailov was a part of the senior Russian national teams that won the silver medal at the 1994 FIBA World Championship, and the 1998 FIBA World Championship. He also won a silver medal at the 1993 EuroBasket, and a bronze medal at the 1997 EuroBasket, where he also earned an All-EuroBasket Team selection. He also played with Russia at the 1995 EuroBasket.

References

External links
Euroleague.net Profile
FIBA Archive Profile
FIBA Europe Profile
Spanish League Archive Profile 
ProBallers.com Profile
Eurobasket.com Profile

1971 births
Living people
1994 FIBA World Championship players
1998 FIBA World Championship players
Aris B.C. players
CB Estudiantes players
Centers (basketball)
Liga ACB players
PBC Ural Great players
People from Zlatoust
Power forwards (basketball)
Real Betis Baloncesto players
Real Madrid Baloncesto players
Russian basketball coaches
Russian expatriate basketball people in Spain
Russian expatriates in Argentina
Russian men's basketball players
Spanish basketball coaches
Spanish men's basketball players
Sportspeople from Chelyabinsk Oblast